Sean Higgins may refer to:
 Sean Higgins (footballer) (born 1984), Scottish footballer
 Sean Higgins (basketball) (born 1968), American basketball player

See also
 Shaun Higgins (born 1988), Australian footballer
 Shaun Higgins (soccer) (born 1978), American soccer player